Mormodes maculata is a species of orchid endemic to central and southern Mexico.

References

maculata
Endemic orchids of Mexico
Plants described in 1838